The Journal of Management Information Systems (JMIS) is a top-tier peer-reviewed academic journal that publishes impactful research articles making a significant novel contribution in the areas of information systems and information technology. It was established in 1984. The present editor-in-chief of JMIS is Vladimir Zwass. JMIS is published by Taylor & Francis in print and online.

The mission of JMIS is to present an integrated view of the field of Information Systems (IS) through the significant novel contributions by the best thinkers.  The IS discipline seeks to understand how systems can be organized, developed, and deployed effectively to manage information and knowledge toward specified outcomes, in order to support people, organizations, marketplaces, and products. Numerous now prominent research streams in the discipline have their origins in the foundational paper published in the Journal.  JMIS has always reflected the belief that thematic and methodological diversity of the highest quality papers within a well-defined IS domain is the strength of the field.

JMIS is ranked as one of the three top-tier Information Systems journals, along with Information Systems Research (ISR) and MIS Quarterly (MISQ), in the comprehensive scientometric study published in MISQ and confirmed by other scholarly studies. JMIS is one of the 50 leading scholarly journals on the Financial Times FT50 list.

JMIS serves the researchers investigating new modes of information technology deployment and the changing landscape of information policy making, as well as practitioners and executives managing the information resource. Along with the pursuit of knowledge, the quarterly aims to serve the societal goals, and to bridge the gap between theory and practice of information systems.

The journal accepts for the double-blind review full-scale research submissions that make a significant contribution to the field of information systems. Such contributions may present:
 Impactful and methodologically sound empirical and theoretical work leading to the progress of the IS knowledge field
 Paradigmatic and generalizable designs and applications
 Analyses of informational policy making in an organizational, national, or international setting
 Investigations of societal and economic issues of organizational computing, in particular aiming at the improvements in health, sustainability, and equity

Analytical attention is focused on the following key issues:
 Information systems for competitive positioning
 Business processes and management enabled by information technology
 Business value of information technology
 Resilience and security of information-technology infrastructures
 Entrepreneurial deployment of information technology
 Management of information resources
 Relationship between information technology and organizational performance and structures
 Enterprise-wide systems architectures and infrastructures
 Electronic business, net-enabled organizations, and platforms
 The organization and impacts of big data and data analytics
 Artificial intelligence with machine learning in organizational information systems
 Social media, social commerce, and social networks in the organizational perspective
 Systems sourcing, development, and stewardship in organizations
 Informational support of collaborative work and co-creation
 Knowledge management, organizational learning, and organizational memory
 The human element in organizational computing

The submissions are refereed in a double-blind process by the internationally recognized expert referees and by Associate Editors who serve on the distinguished Editorial Board of JMIS. JMIS reviews have been ranked #1 in 2020 for quality and timeliness by the IS scholarly community.

See also 
 MIS Quarterly
 Information Systems Research

References

External links
 
 Journal page at publisher's website

Business and management journals
Information systems journals
Quarterly journals
English-language journals
Taylor & Francis academic journals